Hiland Park is the name given to a  micro-township in Kolkata, India. It is situated on Eastern Metropolitan Bypass at Chak Garia. The micro township features a Residential Complex, which includes a number of recreational facilities,  a Shopping Mall named Metropolis Mall and a Social Club called The County.

The Residential complex has 9 building towers. The towers are named Peak (27 floors), Cape (24 floors), Brook (24 floors), Fjord (21 floors), Bay (21 floors), Glen (18 floors), Isle (18 floors), Ridge (18 floors) and Loch (18 floors). There are a total of 941 residential units comprising standard apartments, duplex and penthouses.

Hiland Park is one of the most important landmarks along Eastern Metropolitan Bypass.

References

Buildings and structures in Kolkata